Benjamin "Ben" Ogden (born February 13, 2000) is an American cross-country skier. He has been a member of the U.S. Cross Country Ski Team since 2019. Ogden made history in 2018 at the FIS Junior World Ski Championships in Goms, Switzerland, when he and his teammates secured a silver medal in the junior men's relay, which was the first ever medal for the U.S. men at a World Juniors Championship event.

Early life
Ogden grew up in Landgrove, Vermont. He and his older sister, Katherine, who is also a professional skier, were taught to ski by their father. As a young skier, he trained with the West River Nordic Club at the Wild Wings XC Center.

Athletic career

2017–2018: Juniors 
In 2018, Ogden became one of 12 skiers named to the squad for the FIS Nordic Junior World Ski Championships by U.S. Ski & Snowboard. Ogden, along with teammates Luke Jager, Hunter Wonders, and Gus Schumacher, won the silver medal in the 4 × 5 km relay race – the first ever medal for the U.S. men at the World Junior Ski Championships. Ogden skied the second leg of the relay, moving the team up from sixth to fourth place at the hand-off.

2018–2019: Return to Juniors and World Cup debut 
Ogden was nominated to the 2018–2019 U.S. Ski Team as a member of the D Team. During the 2019 FIS Nordic Junior World Ski Championships in Lahti, Ogden and his teammates won the gold medal in the 4 × 5 km relay race, improving upon the result the U.S. had achieved during the previous season. Ogden skied the second classic leg for the team composed of Luke Jager, Johnny Hagenbuch, and Gus Schumacher. Ogden made his World Cup debut on 22 March 2019 in Quebec City, Canada. He was one of nine SMS T2 skiers to qualify for the 2018–2019 World Cup Finals.

2019–2020: World Juniors Gold and NCAA Championships 
Ogden was again nominated to the D Team with the U.S. Ski Team for the 2019–2020 season. On 6 March 2020, Ogden, Jager, Hagenbuch, and Schumacher became repeat champions and took home the gold medal at the 2020 FIS Junior Cross Country World Championships in Oberwiesenthal. Later that month, Ogden took first place in the 10 km freestyle race at the 2020 NCAA National Skiing Championships in Bozeman, Montana. On 12 March 2020, 30 minutes after the freestyle podium ceremony, the NCAA announced that all remaining races were cancelled due to COVID-19 concerns.

2020–2021 
The Davis U.S. Cross Country Ski Team announced their roster for the 2020–2021 season on 7 November 2020, with Ogden once again included as a member of the D Team.

2021–2022: Olympic Debut 
At the 2022 Winter Olympics in Beijing, Ogden placed 12th in the freestyle sprint race, which was the best-ever men’s individual sprint finish for the United States. At the 2022 NCAA National Skiing Championships, Ogden claimed his second national title when he won the men's 10 km classical race.

Cross-country skiing results
All results are sourced from the International Ski Federation (FIS).

Olympic Games

Distance reduced to 30 km due to weather conditions.

World Championships

World Cup

Season standings

Personal life
Ogden graduated from the Stratton Mountain School in 2018 and is currently enrolled as a graduate student at the University of Vermont, where he studies mechanical engineering. Ogden is a member of the UVM ski team, and he trains with the SMS T2 Team, an elite professional team based in Stratton Mountain, Vermont when his schedule allows.

References

External links

Ben Ogden at U.S. Ski and Snowboard
Ben Ogden at International Ski Federation

2000 births
Living people
American male cross-country skiers
Tour de Ski skiers
Cross-country skiers at the 2022 Winter Olympics
Olympic cross-country skiers of the United States
People from Lebanon, New Hampshire
21st-century American people